The Nature of Things (also, The Nature of Things with David Suzuki) is a Canadian television series of documentary programs. It debuted on CBC Television on November 6, 1960. Many of the programs document nature and the effect that humans have on it. The program "was one of the first mainstream programs to present scientific evidence on a number of environmental issues, including nuclear power and genetic engineering".
The series is named after an epic poem by Roman philosopher Lucretius: "De rerum natura" – On the Nature of Things.

Season 1: 1960–1961 
Sundays at 5:30 pm
Length 30 minutes

Season 2: 1962 
Thursdays at 8:00 pm
Length 30 minutes

Season 3: 1963 
Sundays at 5:30 pm
Length 30 minutes

Season 4: 1964

Season 5: 1965 
Sundays at 5:00 pm
Length 30 minutes

Season 6: 1965–1966

Season 7: 1966 
Mondays at 7:30 pm
Length 30 minutes

1967 Canadian Wildlife Special 
Thursdays at 10:30 pm
Length 30 minutes

Season 9: 1968–1969 
Thursdays at 10:30 pm
Length 30 minutes

Season 10: 1969–1970

Season 11: 1970–1971

Season 12: 1971–1972

Season 13: 1972–1973

Season 14: 1973–1974 
Mondays at 10:00 pm
Length 30 minutes

Season 15: 1974

Season 16: 1975

Season 17: 1976–1977 
Wednesdays at 8:00 pm
Length 30 minutes

Season 18: 1977–1978

Season 19: 1978–1979

Season 20: 1979–1980

Season 21: 1980–1981 
Wednesdays at 8:00 pm
Length 1 hour

Season 22: 1981–1982 
Wednesdays at 8:00 pm
Length 1 hour

Season 23: 1982–1983 
Wednesdays at 8:00 pm
Length 1 hour

Season 24: 1983–1984 
Wednesdays at 8:00 pm
Length 1 hour

Season 25: 1984–1985 
Wednesdays at 8:00 pm
Length 1 hour

Season 26: 1985–1986 
Wednesdays at 8:00 pm
Length 1 hour

Season 27: 1986–1987

Season 28: 1987–1988

Season 29: 1988–1989

Season 30: 1989–1990

Season 31: 1990–1991

Season 32: 1991–1992

Season 33: 1992–1993

Season 34: 1993–1994

Season 35: 1994–1995

Season 36: 1995–1996

Season 37: 1996–1997

Season 38: 1998

Season 39: 1998–1999

Season 40: 1999–2000

Season 41: 2000–2001

Season 42: 2001–2002

Season 43: 2002–2003

Season 44: 2003–2004

Season 45: 2004–2005

Season 46: 2005–2006

2006–2007: Specials

Season 47: 2007–2008

Season 48: 2008–2009

Season 49: 2009–2010

Season 50: 2010–2011

Season 51: 2011–2012

Season 52: 2012–2013

Season 53: 2013–2014

Season 54: 2014–2015

Season 55: 2015–2016

Season 56: 2016–2017 
Thursdays at 8:00 pm
Length 1 hour

Season 57: 2017–2018 
Sundays
Length 1 hour

Season 58: 2018–2019 
Sundays
Length 1 hour

Season 59: 2019–2020 
Fridays
Length 1 hour

Season 60: 2020–2021 
Fridays
Length 1 hour

References 

jaipur f

Lists of non-fiction television series episodes
Lists of Canadian television series episodes